WOJO (105.1 FM) is a radio station  broadcasting a Regional Mexican format. Licensed to Evanston, Illinois, United States, the station serves the Chicago area. The station is currently owned by Tichenor License Corporation, a division of Uforia Audio Network.

WOJO's studios are located at 541 N. Fairbanks Ct, Suite 1100, Chicago, and its transmitter is located atop the John Hancock Center.

HD Programming
The station is also broadcast on HD radio. As of January 2016,
HD1 is a digital simulcast of the traditional (analog) broadcast.
HD2 airs a hip hop format known as "Streetz 95.1".
HD3 is a simulcast of Spanish sports station WRTO

History

WEAW
The station began broadcasting in February 1947, and held the call sign WEAW. The station was owned by North Shore Broadcasting, and its call sign stood for its president Edward A. Wheeler.

The station broadcast at 104.3 MHz briefly in 1947, before moving to 96.7 MHz later that year. The station's transmitter was located in Evanston and it had an ERP of 665 watts. In 1948, the station's frequency was changed to 105.1 MHz and its ERP was increased to 36,000 watts at a HAAT of 240 feet. The call sign officially became WEAW-FM in 1953 when a companion AM station was launched. In 1961, the station's ERP was increased to 180,000 watts. In 1970, the station's transmitter was moved to the top of the new John Hancock Center in Chicago, with its ERP reduced to 6,000 watts.

Among the music heard on WEAW was light music, easy listening, classical music, and show tunes. The station also carried programs from local schools, community organizations, and Northwestern University. The station also broadcast background music to stores and other businesses, with ads removed for subscribers. By 1964, all of its subscription services had been moved to subcarriers.

From 1947 through the 1960s, WEAW broadcast Northwestern Wildcats football games. It was also the flagship station of the Chicago White Sox radio network in 1971 and 1972.

WOJO
By late 1972, most of the station's programming was in Spanish, and in December 1972, its callsign was changed to WOJO.

In 1986, WOJO was sold to Tichenor Media for $1.4 million. In 1997, Tichenor Media merged with Heftel Broadcasting to form the Hispanic Broadcasting Corporation, which merged with Univision Communications in 2004.

References

External links
Official site of WOJO "La Buena 105.1 FM" (with streaming audio)
Official Radio Maria Chicago site (with streaming audio)

Mexican-American culture in Illinois
OJO
Evanston, Illinois
Univision Radio Network stations
OJO
Radio stations established in 1947
1947 establishments in Illinois